Se'ei Sa'u (born 3 November 1974) is a former Australian rugby union player. She represented  at the 2010 Women's Rugby World Cup, they finished in third place.

In 2008, Sa'u was part of the squad that played a Two-Test series against the Black Ferns in Canberra in October.

References

1974 births
Living people
Australia women's international rugby union players
Australian female rugby union players
Rugby union props